Union was launched in 1791 in Liverpool. She became a slave ship that the French captured on her first slave voyage. Captain R. Farrington sailed for West Africa on 15 August 1792.

Captain George Hauit acquired a letter of marque for Union on 1 March 1793, just after the outbreak of war with France.

The capture of Union took place off Bassa. 

 recaptured Little Joe and Echo.  recaptured Prosperity; the cutter  recaptured Mercury. Liberty ransomed Swift after plundering her.

Notes, citations, and references
Notes

Citations

References
 

1791 ships
Age of Sail merchant ships of England
Liverpool slave ships
Captured ships